In rhetoric, litotes (or ), also known classically as antenantiosis or moderatour, is a figure of speech and form of verbal irony in which understatement is used to emphasize a point by stating a negative to further affirm a positive, often incorporating double negatives for effect. Litotes is a form of understatement, which can be in the form of meiosis, and is always deliberate with the intention of emphasis. However, the interpretation of negation may depend on context, including cultural context. In speech, litotes may also depend on intonation and emphasis; for example, the phrase "not bad" can be intonated differently so as to mean either "mediocre" or "excellent". Along the same lines, litotes can be used (as a form of auxesis), to euphemistically provide emphasis by diminishing the harshness of an observation; "He isn't the cleanest person I know" could be used as a means of indicating that someone is a messy person.

The use of litotes is common in English, Russian, German, Yiddish, Dutch, Hebrew, Aramaic, Greek, Ukrainian, Polish, Mandarin, French, Czech and Slovak, and is also prevalent in a number of other languages and dialects. It is a feature of Old English poetry and of the Icelandic sagas and is a means of much stoical restraint.

Classical litotes
The first known mention of litotes is in a letter from Cicero in 56 B.C. Cicero uses the word to mean simplicity (or frugality) of life. Over time, however, the meaning and the function of the word changed from 'simple' to the idea of understatement that involves double negatives, a way to state things simply.

Old Norse had several types of litotes. These points are denied negatives ("She's not a terrible wife" meaning "she's a good wife"), denied positives ("He's not a great learner" meaning "he has difficulty learning"), creating litotes without negating anything, and creating litotes using a negative adjective ("Days spent in his home left him unenthused" meaning "he preferred to be out and about").

Litotes and ethos
Litotes can be used to establish ethos, or credibility, by expressing modesty or downplaying one's accomplishments to gain the audience's favor. In the book Rhetorica ad Herennium litotes is addressed as a member of The Figures of Thought known as deminutio, or understatement. It is listed in conjunction with antenantiosis and meiosis, two other forms of rhetorical deminutio. For example, a very accomplished artist might say "I'm not a bad painter", and by refraining from bragging but still acknowledging his skill, the artist is seen as talented, modest, and credible.

Examples

Other languages

Classical Greek
In Classical Greek, instances of litotes can be found as far back as Homer. In Book 24 of the Iliad, Zeus describes Achilles as follows: "οὔτε γάρ ἔστ᾽ ἄφρων οὔτ᾽ ἄσκοπος ..." (line 186), "he is neither unthinking, nor unseeing", meaning that he is both wise and prudent.

French
In French,  (not bad) is used similarly to the English, while  ("he is not disagreeable") is another example, actually meaning  ("he is nice"), though the speaker is reluctant to admit it. (As with all litotes, this phrase can also be used with its literal meaning that the thing is not stupid but rather may be clever or occupy the middle ground between stupid and clever.)

One of the most famous litotes of French literature is in Pierre Corneille's  (1636). The heroine, Chimène, says to her lover Rodrigue, who just killed her father), meaning "I love you".

Chinese
In Chinese, the phrase  (Pinyin: , traditional characters , literally "not wrong") is often used to present something as very good or correct. In this way, it is distinct in meaning from the English "not bad" (though not "not bad at all") or the general use of the French . Also, the phrase  (pinyin , traditional characters , literally "not simple") is used to refer to an impressive feat.

Danish

In Danish, understatements using litotes are seen as characteristic of the Jutlandic dialect. A stereotypical example is the phrase  ("it is not even so bad"), which is used to mean "that's great".

Dutch and German 
Similarly, in Dutch, the phrase  (also literally meaning "not bad") is often used to present something as very good or correct, as is German .

Italian
In Italian,  (literally "less bad") is similar to the English expression, "So much the better" – used to comment that a situation is more desirable than its negative (cf. Winston Churchill's comment, since transformed into a snowclone, that "democracy is the worst form of government except for all the others").

Latin
In Latin, an example of litotes can be found in Ovid's Metamorphoses:  (bk. 1 ln. 692, "not one occasion"), meaning "on more than one occasion".

Russian

An example of litotes can be found in the Nikolai Gogol's The Government Inspector, in which the Mayor says: "There's no such thing as a man with no sins on his conscience", meaning "All men have sins on their conscience" (Act 1, Scene 1). In this case, it is used to downplay the Mayor's statement – a euphemism of sorts – making it less harsh than its understood meaning.

Spanish
In Spanish, it is usual to say  ("It's not at all foolish"), as a form of compliment (i.e., to say something was smart or clever).

Swedish
In Swedish, it is quite common to use litotes. For example, when one chances to meet someone after a long time it is usual to say:  ("It wasn't yesterday").

Turkish
In Turkish, it is quite common to say  ("Not so bad") as a form of compliment.

Welsh
In Welsh,  ("To be disappointed on the best side") means "to be pleasantly surprised".

See also
 Antiphrasis
 Hyperbole

Notes

References

External links

 
 Biblical Litotes
 Definition and examples
 

Figures of speech
Rhetorical techniques